Legacy is a blues album released in 1998 by Jimmy D. Lane.

Track listing
"Hey Little Girl"
"Clue Me"
"Four O'Clock in the Morning"
"Going Downtown"
"Another Mule Kickin' in My Stall"
"In This Bed"
"Call It Blues"
"One Room Country Shack" (Mercy Dee Walton)
"Big House"
"Baby's Mule"
"Dem Blues"
"Pride" 
"It's All Good"

References

1998 albums